Polyptychus sinus is a moth of the  family Sphingidae. It is known from Gabon.

References

Endemic fauna of Gabon
Polyptychus
Moths described in 1985
Fauna of Gabon
Moths of Africa